Phulra or Kingdom of Phulra  was a Muslim princely state in the days of British Raj and ruled by the Tanoli tribe of Mughal Barlas confederation, located in the region of the North West Frontier to the east of the nearby parent princely state of Amb (Tanawal).

The territory covered by the state remains part of the present-day Khyber-Pakhtunkhwa, as a Union Council of the tehsil of Mansehra.

History 
The state was founded in 1828, when Mir Painda Khan Tanoli, the ruler of Amb, granted the area of Phulra as a small principality to his brother, Maddad Khan Tanoli. There is some uncertainty as to whether Phulra ranked as a full princely state of India before 1919, and until then it may have had the status of a feudatory landed estate or jagir, but it was given British imperial state recognition as Phulra was recognised as a princely state in 1919 and 1921, in the official Imperial Gazetteer of Indian Empire. Phulrah had been under suzerainty of the Raja of Kashmir until 1889, when it accepted a British protectorate, entering into a subsidiary alliance with British India. 

In 1947, soon after the British had departed from the Indian subcontinent, the last ruler of Phulra signed an Instrument of Accession to the new Dominion of Pakistan, and Phulra was a princely state of Pakistan from then until September 1950, when it was incorporated into the North West Frontier Province following the death of its last ruler.

Dynasty 
The state was ruled by a collateral line of the hereditary Tanoli Nawabs (rulers) of Amb. Amb and Phulra together were sometimes referred to as "Feudal Tanawal".

Descendants of Maddad Khan 
Maddad Khan, the original Khan of Phulra, had two branches of offspring i.e. a senior branch and a junior branch. After the State of Phulra was abolished, both these branches continue to be represented in the area. The descendants of its last Nawab Khan Abdul Latif Khan Tanoli, remained in the area as private residents.

Of the junior branch, Maddad Khan Tanoli had four sons from one wife: Ameer Khan Tanoli, Abdullah Khan Tanoli, Arsla Khan Tanoli and Hussain Khan Tanoli، (his son safiullah khan Tanoli played a ministry role under the khan-i-Zaman khan Tanoli and then his successor Muhammad Farid khan Tanoli ruler of amb state). From second wife Bahadur Khan Tanoli was one other surviving son. There descendants are living in Gojra village, Masand, Doga, shergarh, Kangra colony and in Rawalpindi. They are all private citizens today.

See also
Ruler of Tanawal - Mulk - e - Tanwal

References

External links and sources 
 Government of Khyber-Pakhtunkhwa
 Government of Pakistan
 WorldStatesmen - Pakistan - Princely States
 https://www.scribd.com/doc/63020034/Tarikh-E-Hazara-Original-by-Dr-Sher-Bahadur-Khan-Punni-V01

Mansehra District
Princely states of Pakistan
Princely states of India
States and territories established in 1828
1950 disestablishments in Pakistan